Robert R. Wright, Jr. (August 16, 1844 – August 4, 1927) was an American politician who served as the mayor of Denver, Colorado from 1901 to 1904.

References

Mayors of Denver
1844 births
1927 deaths
People from Wilbraham, Massachusetts